Mount Tate is a prominent rocky mountain on the Main Range of the Snowy Mountains located in southeastern New South Wales, Australia.

It has views along the Main Range towards Mount Twynam and down to the Geehi Valley.

See also

 Australian Alps
 List of mountains in New South Wales

References

Snowy Mountains
Tate